Ragnhild Kaarbø (26 December 1889 – 20 August 1949) was a Norwegian painter.

Personal life
She was born at Harstad  in Troms, Norway. She was one of thirteen children born to Rikard Kaarbø and Anna Elisabeth Lund. Her father was a successful businessman who was associated with the establishment of the town of Harstad. He founded several businesses and fostered development of the local shipping industry.

Career
Kaarbø attended a boarding school in Celle, Germany and decided to pursue a career in art. She studied at the Norwegian National Academy of Craft and Art Industry in Kristiania (now Oslo), and further with Henrik Sørensen and Harriet Backer, and with expressionist Kees van Dongen in Paris. In 1918, she held her first solo exhibition in the Artists' Association in Kristiania (now Oslo).

Between 1920 and 1930 she stayed mainly in Paris where she followed the teaching of several noted artists, including Andre Lhote and Pedro Luiz Correia de Araújo (Brazilian, Paris- and Rio-based, 1874-1955).  Between 1925-1927 she was a student of Fernand Léger and Amédée Ozenfant at the Académie Moderne. 

During her early years, Kaarbø was influenced by Fauvism, and painted many expressionistic portraits of women. She then had a period when she mainly painted landscapes, both coastal subjects and town motifs. In Paris in the 1920s she was influenced by Cubism and other avant-garde styles. The exhibition was met with great interest but mostly negative criticism, and Kunstnerforbundet was even boycotted by the press. Disappointed by the negative response, Kaarbø switched to painting landscapes in an Impressionist style.

She participated in several exhibitions, including two works at the Salon d'automne in 1922, and she participated in the Exposition Académie Moderne Exhibition at the Gallery of Art Contemporain in 1926 and the Exposition de l'Académie Moderne Léger Ozenfant in the Gallery Aubier in 1927.
Among her works at the National Gallery of Norway are Komposisjon med hode from 1925 and Fra Siena from 1937.

Kaarbø was included in the 2013 exhibition Electromagnetic: Modern Art in Northern Europe 1918-31 at the Henie Onstad Art Center.

References

External links

1889 births
1949 deaths
People from Harstad
Norwegian women painters
Norwegian expatriates in France
19th-century Norwegian painters
20th-century Norwegian painters